The Dance Smartly Stakes is a thoroughbred horse race run annually during July at Woodbine Racetrack in Toronto, Ontario, Canada. A Grade II stakes race raced on turf, it is open to horses three years of age and older

Inaugurated in 1986, it was raced on dirt through 1989 at a distance of  miles. In 1990 it was switched over to the turf course and raced that year at  miles after which it remained on the turf but at its original  miles. It was lengthened to  miles in 2017.

It was raced as the Woodbine (Breeders' Cup) Handicap until 1998 when it was renamed to honor Dance Smartly, a Canadian and United States Racing Hall of Fame inductee and one of Canada's greatest racing fillies.

Records
Time record: (on Turf at  miles)
 1:44.25 – Overheard (2014)

Most wins:
 2 – Radiant Ring (1991, 1992)

Most wins by an owner:
 3 – Sam-Son Farm (1991, 1992, 1998)

Most wins by a jockey:
 4 – Patrick Husbands (1999, 2003, 2010, 2016)
 3 – Todd Kabel (1997, 1998, 2006)

Most wins by a trainer:
 3 – Roger Attfield (1987, 2002, 2005)

Winners

*In 1986, Triple Wow finished first but was disqualified and placed last  following a positive test for a banned medication.

See also
 List of Canadian flat horse races

References

Graded stakes races in Canada
Turf races in Canada
Open mile category horse races
Recurring events established in 1986
Woodbine Racetrack
1986 establishments in Ontario